Centerville School is a K-12 school in Centerville, unincorporated St. Mary Parish, Louisiana, United States. It is a part of St. Mary Parish School Board and is the only full K-12 public school in the parish. In addition to Centerville it also serves Garden City and Ricohoc.

References

External links
 Centerville School

Schools in St. Mary Parish, Louisiana
Public elementary schools in Louisiana
Public middle schools in Louisiana
Public high schools in Louisiana